Chandrima Bhattacharya is an All India Trinamool Congress politician and the current Minister of State for Finance (Independent Charge), Health and Family Welfare, Land and Land Reforms, Refugee and Rehabilitation of the Government of West Bengal. Previously she acted as a minister in the first reshuffle of the ministry in January 2012 after Mamata Banerjee took over as Chief Minister. She was also made the junior Law Minister in October 2012. She was promoted as a cabinet minister and given independent charge of Law and Judicial Department, Government of West Bengal in November 2012.

Bhattacharya holds an LL.B (1976) degree from the University of Calcutta. She was also a practising advocate in Calcutta High Court till the 2011 elections.

She had been elected a Member of the Legislative Assembly on an All India Trinamool Congress ticket from Dum Dum Uttar (Vidhan Sabha constituency) in 2011 and 2021 and from Kanthi Dakshin (Vidhan Sabha constituency) in 2017.

References

1955 births
21st-century Indian women politicians
21st-century Indian politicians
Trinamool Congress politicians from West Bengal
Living people
Politicians from Kolkata
West Bengal MLAs 2011–2016
West Bengal MLAs 2016–2021
Women in West Bengal politics